The 2005 IFMAR 1:10 Electric Off-Road World Championships was the tenth edition of the IFMAR 1:10 Electric Off-Road World Championship was held on August 6–13, 2005.

2WD Results

4WD Results

References

External links
 Neo Buggy Event Photogallery

IFMAR 1:10 Electric Off-Road World Championship